Clifford Charles Holton (29 April 1929 – 31 May 1996) was an English footballer.

Born in Oxford, Holton played as a full back for non-league Oxford City as a youth, before joining Arsenal in October 1947 at the age of 18. He spent three seasons in Arsenal's' reserve team, eventually converting to a centre forward, although his progress was restricted in part by national service. He made his debut against Stoke City on 26 December 1950; initially a bit-part player, he became an established regular in the side in 1951–52 and remained there for three seasons. He was in the Arsenal side to reach the FA Cup Final in 1952.

With 22 goals (19 of them in the league) he helped Arsenal to a First Division title in 1952–53. However, he lost his place in the Arsenal side in 1954–55, before returning the following season (1955–56), having been converted into a utility man – playing in defence, midfield or up front. He continued to figure for Arsenal for another three seasons and on 6 October 1956, he scored four goals in a home match against Manchester City, becoming the first player since Jack Lambert to score more than three in a game at Highbury. In all he scored 88 goals in 217 matches for Arsenal. Although he was often tipped for an England place, he never won a cap for his country.

Holton was sold to Watford in October 1958 for £9,000, a somewhat surprising move, considering Watford were in the newly formed Fourth Division at the time. Holton spent three seasons with the Hornets, mostly at centre forward. He formed a successful partnership with Dennis Uphill, scoring a club record 48 goals in 1959–60, which also saw the club promoted to the Third Division. Holton was then controversially sold to Northampton Town in 1961 where he scored a club record 36 goals in 1961–62, thus achieving the rare feat of holding the all-time goals in a season record at two different clubs.

Holton went on to play for Crystal Palace, signing in December 1962 and was part of the Palace side which achieved promotion to the second tier in 1964, with 43 appearances that season scoring 20 goals. He then signed for Watford (for a second time) on 6 May 1965, before moving on to Charlton Athletic (in a deal which saw Stewart Scullion move in the opposite direction) and subsequently Leyton Orient. He finally retired in 1968, due in part to a knee injury, and left the game completely to take up a career in engineering. He died suddenly while on holiday in 1996, at the age of 67.

Honours

First Division: 1952–53
FA Charity Shield: 1953

References

External links
Cliff Holton Stats at neilbrown.com
Cliff Holton at holmesdale.net

1929 births
Military personnel from Oxfordshire
20th-century British Army personnel
English footballers
Association football forwards
Arsenal F.C. players
Watford F.C. players
Northampton Town F.C. players
Crystal Palace F.C. players
Charlton Athletic F.C. players
Leyton Orient F.C. players
1996 deaths
Footballers from Oxford
London XI players
English Football League players
English cricketers
Oxfordshire cricketers
FA Cup Final players